Ouratea amplectens is a species of plant in the family Ochnaceae. It is found in Ghana and Liberia. It is threatened by habitat loss.

References

amplectens
Endemic flora of Ghana
Endemic flora of Liberia
Vulnerable flora of Africa
Taxonomy articles created by Polbot
Taxobox binomials not recognized by IUCN